Bardo Hotel Soundtrack is soundtrack album by American post-punk band Tuxedomoon, released on June 27, 2006 by Made to Measure.

Track listing

Personnel 
Adapted from the Bardo Hotel Soundtrack liner notes.

Tuxedomoon
 Steven Brown – saxophone, clarinet, keyboards, tape, recording (7, 12)
 Peter Dachert (as Peter Principle) – bass guitar, guitar, editing, recording (1-6, 8-11, 13-20)
 Luc Van Lieshout – trumpet, flugelhorn, harmonica, recording (16, 19)
 Blaine L. Reininger – violin, guitar, editing
Additional musicians
 George Kakanakis – percussion (6, 17)

Production and additional personnel
 Coti – editing, recording (9)
 Evgeniou – photography
 Marc Hollander – editing
 Vincent Kenis – editing
 NoLogo – design

Release history

References

External links 
 Bardo Hotel Soundtrack at Discogs (list of releases)

2006 soundtrack albums
Tuxedomoon albums
Crammed Discs albums
Film soundtracks